Roberts Savaļnieks (born 4 February 1993 in Valmiera) is a Latvian footballer, who currently plays for FK RFS in the Latvian Higher League.

Club career 
Originally, from Valmiera, Savaļnieks moved to Liepāja at an early age to train and play for the youth teams of Liepājas Metalurgs. He was taken to the first team in 2009, and with the playing time gradually growing, Savaļnieks became a first eleven player in 2012. Over the period of five consecutive seasons with the club he participated in 80 league matches and scored 5 goals, as well as played in the UEFA Champions League and Europa League. In January 2014 Savaļnieks went on trial with the Polish Ekstraklasa club Jagiellonia Białystok and signed a contract with them for half-a-year with an option to extend it for two more years. He made his debut for the club on 16 February 2014, coming on as a substitute in a 1-0 league defeat to Ruch Chorzów. In June 2014 it was revealed that Jagiellonia would not extend Savaļnieks' contract and after its expiry he shall look for a new club. Having played 3 league and 1 cup match, Savaļnieks left the club in July 2014 to return to the Latvian Higher League and join the newly established FK Liepāja. With 11 appearances and 2 goals in the remaining part of the season he helped the club finish the league in the top four. After winning the Virsliga with FK Liepāja in 2015 Roberts Savaļnieks joined Riga FC.

International career
Savaļnieks was a member of Latvia U-18, Latvia U-19 and Latvia U-21 football teams. On 25 February 2014 Savaļnieks was firstly called-up to Latvia national football team for the following friendly match against Republic of Macedonia on 5 March 2014. He remained an unused substitute throughout the match.

International goals
Scores and results list Latvia's goal tally first.

Honours

Club
 Latvian Higher League champion: 2009, 2015
 Latvian Cup winner: 2019

National team
 Baltic Cup winner: 2016, 2018

References

External links
 
 
 

1993 births
Living people
People from Valmiera
Latvian footballers
Latvia international footballers
Association football midfielders
FK Liepājas Metalurgs players
Jagiellonia Białystok players
Expatriate footballers in Poland
Ekstraklasa players
Latvian expatriate footballers
Latvian expatriate sportspeople in Poland
FK Liepāja players
Riga FC players
FK RFS players